SMS Ägir was the second and final member of the Odin class of coastal defense ships (Küstenpanzerschiffe) built for the Imperial German Navy. She had one sister ship, . Ägir was named for the norse god, and was built by the Kaiserliche Werft Danzig shipyard between 1893 and 1896. She was armed with a main battery of three  guns. She served in the German fleet throughout the 1890s and was rebuilt in 1901–1903. She served in the VI Battle Squadron after the outbreak of World War I in August 1914, but saw no action. Ägir was demobilized in 1915 and used as a tender thereafter. After the war, she was rebuilt as a merchant ship and served in this capacity until December 1929, when she was wrecked on the island of Gotland.

Design

In the late 1880s, the German  (Imperial Navy) grappled with the problem of what type of capital ship to build in the face of limited naval budgets (owing to parliamentary objections to naval spending and the cost of dredging the Kaiser Wilhelm Canal). Proposals for the last four included redesigning the vessels to add another main battery gun in two-gun turrets came to nothing owing to the cost of other naval programs—most notably the s. The two  ships were ultimately built to a modified version of the Siegfried design that incorporated improvements to the armor layout and other minor changes.

Her propulsion system consisted of two vertical 3-cylinder triple-expansion steam engines. Steam for the engines was provided by eight coal-fired Thornycroft boilers. Because she had twice the number of electrical generators as her sister, Ägir was nicknamed "Elektrische Anna" (Electric Anna). The ship had a crew of 20 officers and 256 enlisted men.

The ship was armed with three  K L/35 guns mounted in three single-gun barbettes fitted with gun shields. Two were placed side by side forward, and the third was located aft of the main superstructure. They were supplied with a total of 204 rounds of ammunition. The ship was also equipped with a secondary battery of ten  SK L/30 guns in single mounts spaced along the center part of the vessel, five guns per broadside. Ägir also carried three  torpedo tubes, two in swivel mounts on the deck amidships and one in the bow, submerged below the waterline.

Modifications
In 1903–1904, Ägir was extensively rebuilt. The modernization work was completed by 1903, at which point she returned to active service.

Service history

Construction – 1899

She was launched on 3 April 1895, and was christened by Kaiser Wilhelm II at the ceremony. Fitting-out work was completed by October 1896, and she was commissioned on 15 October 1896 for sea trials, which lasted until April 1897. After completing her trials, Ägir had her crew reduced and she was assigned to the Reserve Division of the Baltic Sea, where she became the 2nd flagship on 29 September. The unit was at that time based in Kiel. In July, KK Oskar von Truppel took command of the ship for a month before her crew was again reduced in August. Upon the ship's reactivation in September, KK Max Rollmann became the ship's captain. Ägir embarked on a short training cruise to Wilhelmshaven in November.

The ship conducted shooting practice in 1898 and participated in the annual training maneuvers with the rest of the German fleet in August and September. During the exercises, which were held in the Baltic and North Seas, she served as the flagship of II Battle Squadron, which was temporarily formed for the maneuvers. The unit included her sister ship  and four of the Siegfried-class ships, along with the two s and a flotilla of torpedo boats.  (Rear Admiral) Paul Hoffmann flew his flag aboard Ägir. After the end of the exercises, KK Hugo von Pohl relieved Rollmann in October. In December, she and Odin visited Copenhagen, Denmark, on a training cruise.

From late April to 31 May 1899, Ägir was activated for operations with I Battle Squadron in place of the armored corvette , which had accidentally run aground and needed repairs. Ägir participated in a cruise with the rest of the squadron to Britain, where they represented Germany at an international fleet review held for Queen Victoria's 80th birthday. The ships then cruised south to visit Portugal. During a cruise in the Kattegat in June, Ägir was among the vessels that came to the assistance of the Norddeutscher Lloyd steamship , which had run aground. She also helped pull free the protected cruiser , which had also grounded in the Great Belt. The next month, KK Max Bachem replaced Pohl. During the fleet maneuvers that year, Ägir served as the flagship of IV Division, II Squadron, under the command of KAdm Conrad von Bodenhausen. Aberfoyle struck Ägir below her forward main battery gun on the starboard side below the waterline in the accident, causing a serious leak. The work was completed quickly, allowing Ägir to participate in the latter stage of the maneuvers. Following the conclusion of the exercises, she returned to the Reserve Division.

1900–1914

On 2 June, Ägir and Odin assisted the passenger liner , which had run aground in the Stettiner Haff. The rest of the year passed relatively uneventfully, apart from the fleet maneuvers in August and September, as usual. On 25 September, the Reserve Division was relocated to Danzig, where Ägir was decommissioned. She continued to operate with the Reserve Division in 1901, and during its active period, the squadron was commanded by KAdm Hugo von Schuckmann, who flew his flag aboard Ägir. KK Gerhard Gerdes took command of the vessel when she was reactivated in July. While on divisional exercises in the Strander Bucht on 6 August, Ägir suffered a boiler room fire that badly injured five crewmen. The ship was initially delayed from participating in the exercises by machinery problems. After the exercises concluded in mid-September, Ägir returned to the Reserve Division of the Baltic. KK von Witzleben replaced Gerdes after the maneuvers, and in October, Ägir embarked on a training cruise in the western Baltic along the coast of East Prussia.

In April 1902, Ägir conducted torpedo practice with the coastal defense ship in the Bay of Kiel. Another training cruise in the Baltic followed in May, by which time KK Hartwig von Dassel had relieved Witzleben temporarily. In June, Witzleben had returned to the vessel, and she went to visit Larvik, Norway. She had returned to Danzig by 30 June, where she was decommissioned for an extensive reconstruction at the  there. The work began in February 1903 and concluded in September 1904. The ship was recommissioned on 10 October and returned to her old unit, which had by this time been expanded into a full squadron. She conducted sea trials through March 1905. During this period, she was assigned to the Naval Artillery Inspectorate along with the coastal defense ship  to serve as training ships for gunnery and torpedo practice. On 2 April, after a cruise in the Baltic, Ägir stopped in Danzig, where her crew assisted in the suppression of a fire at the Klawitter shipyard. Over the following months, she took part in the cruises and training exercises with the other training vessels of the fleet.

In July, the ship took part in experiments with various devices to measure weather and air currents. In June and July, Ägir joined the fleet for a summer cruise to visit numerous ports in Norway, Sweden, and Denmark. From 20 to 24 July, she stopped in Copenhagen with the rest of the fleet. The ship took part in the fleet maneuvers in August and September as usual, after which KK Hugo Louran became the ship's commander. In November she made a short training cruise from Danzig to Kiel. The year 1906 followed the same pattern, including exercises with the fleet's training ships in the first half of the year, a cruise to Norway in July, and the large-scale maneuvers in August and September. KK Maximilian Rogge served as the ship's commander from March to September. He was thereafter replaced by KK Walter Engelhardt. In mid-December, Ägir towed the tanker , which had struck an uncharted shoal off the Vistula estuary. For the next three years, the ship's activity consisted primarily of training exercises; during this period, she was assigned to III Battle Squadron, which was at that time temporarily established each year for the annual fleet maneuvers. Engelhardt remained the ship's captain until March 1909, when KK Friedrich Kloebe relieved him. On 15 September 1909, Ägir was decommissioned in Danzig and was assigned to the inactive reserve fleet.

World War I

Following the outbreak of World War I in July 1914, Ägir was mobilized for wartime service. She was recommissioned on 12 August and assigned to VI Battle Squadron with the other seven coastal defense ships of the Odin and Siegfried classes. Ägir briefly served as the flagship of the squadron's deputy commander, RAdm Ehler Behring before he was transferred to command a different unit in the Baltic. The ships of VI Squadron conducted readiness training for the next month, and on 14 September they were transferred to the North Sea to guard Germany's coast. For the next several months, the ships alternated between the mouth of the Weser river and Jade Bay, the latter being the location of Germany's primary naval base in the North Sea, Wilhelmshaven. In December, the squadron flagship, went to assist the steamer , which had run aground in the outer Jade; Hildebrand grounded as well and was seriously damaged. While Hildebrand was in drydock for repairs, Ägir became the squadron flagship.

On 31 August 1915, the squadron was disbanded, and the next day Ägir was assigned to the harbor flotilla based in the Weser. She remained in service until 14 January 1916, when she was decommissioned in Wilhelmshaven. She was then disarmed and converted into a barracks ship for shipyard workers in Wilhelmshaven, a role she filled to the end of the war. Following Germany's defeat in November 1918, Ägir was stricken from the naval register on 17 June 1919. The navy thereafter sold the ship to be converted into a merchant vessel; the work was done at the Deutsche Werke shipyard in Rüstringen. She was operated by A. Bernstein Co., out of Hamburg, and was used to ship train engines to Leningrad, Soviet Union. She continued in this role until she was wrecked on the island of Gotland off the Karlsö lighthouse on 8 December 1929. Her bow ornament is preserved at the Laboe Naval Memorial.

Footnotes

Notes

Citations

References

Further reading

 

Odin-class coastal defense ships
Ships built in Kiel
1895 ships
World War I coastal defense ships of Germany
Shipwrecks in the Baltic Sea
Maritime incidents in 1929
Merchant ships of Germany